Ralph Dominick Brizzolara (October 28, 1895 - August 8, 1972) was a businessman and was the general manager of the Chicago Bears for 4 seasons.

In 1915, Brizzolara and his brother were passengers on the Great Lakes steamer Eastland when it heeled over and sank in the Chicago River. Both of them escaped through portholes.

He was a friend of George Halas for many years and was given the general manager position when Halas went to the United States Navy. In his second season, he won the NFL Championship. Once Halas returned, he was no longer manager. He died on August 8, 1972, at the age of 76.

References

External links

1895 births
1972 deaths
Chicago Bears executives